Never Say Dinosaur is a tribute album dedicated to Christian rock band Petra. The album includes 11 revisions and re-imaginings of classic Petra songs and one original composition by Kevin Smith of DC Talk. Dinosaur contained an eclectic lineup of artists which, at the time, highlighted "some of the best new bands in Christian music."

The album title is a pun on Petra's fourth studio album, Never Say Die. It is also a pun on the title of Petra's irrelevance and age, who at the time had been performing for nearly twenty-five years, by rejecting comparisons of the band with extinct dinosaurs.

The album was released by Star Song Records in 1996. They worked with the band during most of the 1980s through part of the band's most successful tenure.

Track listing

Personnel
 Executive producer - Darrell A. Harris
 Co-executive producers - Lynn Nichols, Dave Perkins
 Mastered by Steve Marcussen at Precision Mastering, Hollywood, California
 Project coordinator - Debby Austin

References

 

Tribute albums
1996 compilation albums
Christian rock compilation albums